"John Brown" is an anti-war song written and composed by American singer-songwriter Bob Dylan. Written in October 1962, the song was never included on any of Dylan's official studio albums.

Releases
A rough demo of the song performed for publishing company M. Witmark & Sons in August 1963 was eventually given an official release in 2010 on The Bootleg Series Vol. 9 – The Witmark Demos: 1962–1964.

However, a studio version of the song had already been released under the pseudonym "Blind Boy Grunt" in 1963 on a compilation album entitled Broadside Ballads, Vol. 1 (one of five Dylan compositions on the release). This performance was later included in The Best Of Broadside 1962–1988 box set released in 2000. A pseudonym was employed due to contractual issues regarding Dylan performing on non-Columbia Records releases.

Three live versions are officially available: one of Dylan's earliest recorded performances of the song on Live at the Gaslight 1962 (released in 2005), a 1963 performance on Live 1962–1966: Rare Performances From The Copyright Collections (released in 2018), and a 1994 performance on MTV Unplugged (released in 1995).

Song lyrics
"John Brown" consists of twelve verses written in a straightforward manner. The song, composed in Dylan's protest song period, tells a story about a mother who sends her son John Brown to war on some foreign land, and he returns blinded and injured. Thematically, the song is very similar to the old Irish folk-songs "Mrs. McGrath" and "Paddy's Lamentation".

See also
 List of Bob Dylan songs based on earlier tunes
 List of anti-war songs

References

Songs written by Bob Dylan
Bob Dylan songs
1962 songs